Douglas Behl Fairbairn (December 20, 1926 – October 2, 1997) was an American author who mainly wrote about South Florida.

Early life
Born Douglas Behl in Elmira, New York, to Jean Melissa "Missy" (née Fairbairn) and Martin E. Behl.  His father was born in Westphalen, Germany, and came to America as a toddler.  His mother was born in Huntsville, Ontario, Canada. After marrying in Cleveland, Ohio, in 1918, is parents relocated frequently, living in Pennsylvania, New York, and New Jersey.  His parents got a divorce when he was a child and he never saw his father again. (His father moved back to New York City and later died in Santa Barbara, California, in 1967.)  His mother later remarried, to Wesley Hibbard Bunce, and they moved to Coconut Grove, Florida in 1938.  After going by Douglas Bunce for a time, although not officially, he legally changed his last name to his mother's maiden name in 1955.

He attended but did not graduate from Harvard College, where he was editor of the Harvard Lampoon.  He returned to the Miami area where he would live out the rest of his life.

Publications

Novels
A Man's World (1956)
A Squirrel of One's Own (1971)
Shoot (1973)
A Squirrel Forever (1975)
Street 8 (1977)

Memoirs
Down and Out in Cambridge (1982)

Filmography
His screen credits include the television episode "A Man's World" (based on his novel of the same title) for Studio One in Hollywood, the episode "The Voice of Charlie Pont" on Alcoa Premiere (1962), and a 1976 feature film adapted from his 1973 novel of the same name.

References

External links

 New York Times review of Fairbairn's memoirs

1926 births
1997 deaths
20th-century American novelists
20th-century American memoirists
The Harvard Lampoon alumni
Harvard College alumni
American male novelists
20th-century American male writers
American male non-fiction writers